Bachelor of Business Administration (BBA) is a bachelor's degree in business administration awarded by colleges and universities after completion of four years and typically 120 credits of undergraduate study in the fundamentals of business administration, usually including advanced courses in business analytics, business communication, corporate finance, financial accounting, macroeconomics, management, management accounting, marketing, microeconomics, strategic management, supply chain management, and other key academic subjects associated with the academic discipline of business management.

Curriculum structure
The degree is designed to give a broad knowledge of the functional aspects of a company and their interconnection, while also allowing specialization in a particular business-related academic discipline. BBA programs expose students to a range of core subjects and generally allow students to specialize in a specific business-related academic discipline or disciplines.

The BBA degree also develops a student's practical, managerial, and communication skills, and business decision-making capabilities that prepare them for the management of a business entity. Many programs incorporate training and practical experience in the form of case projects, presentations, internships, industrial visits, and interaction with established industry experts. 

General educational requirements emphasize humanities and social sciences, including history, economics, and literature. Core mathematics curriculum are usually required and business-related, including quantitative mathematics accounting, statistics, and related courses. Calculus and business statistics are usually required.

BSBA
The Bachelor of Science in Business Administration (BSBA), is a quantitative variant of the BBA. General educational requirements are even more mathematics-oriented; furthermore, the general focus within business may also be more analytic, often allowing additional quantitative optional coursework.

Accreditation
Particularly in the United States, undergraduate business administration programs are almost always accredited, which represents that the college or university's BBA program meets curriculum quality standards.

World's best business schools
Most business schools operate as schools of business within universities and colleges. As of the 2024 ranking of undergraduate bachelor of business administration degree programs globally, U.S. News & World Report ranked the following business administration programs as the best ten globally:

1: Harvard University (Cambridge, Massachusetts, U.S.)
2: Massachusetts Institute of Technology (Cambridge, Massachusetts, U.S.)
3: Stanford University (Stanford, California, U.S.)
4: University of California, Berkeley (Berkeley, California, U.S.)
5: University of Chicago (Chicago, Illinois, U.S.)
6: University of Pennsylvania (Philadelphia, Pennsylvania, U.S.)
7: London School of Economics (London, UK)
8: Columbia University (New York City, U.S.)
9: New York University (New York City, U.S.)
10:Erasmus University Rotterdam (Rotterdam, Netherlands)

See also 
 Bachelor of Commerce
 Bachelor of Economics
 Bachelor of Finance
 
 Master of Business Administration

References

Business Administration
Business qualifications
Management education